So-yi, also spelled So-yee, is a Korean feminine given name. Its meaning depends on the hanja used to write each syllable of the name. There are 45 hanja with the reading "so" and 35 hanja with the reading "yi" on the South Korean government's official list of hanja which may used in given names. 

People with this name include:

Yoon So-yi (born 1985), South Korean actress
Soyee (born Jang So-jin, 1996), South Korean singer, member of Gugudan
Soy Kim (born Kim So-yeon), South Korean actress

Fictional characters with this name include:
So-yi, in 2011 South Korean television series Deep Rooted Tree

See also
List of Korean given names

References

Korean feminine given names